The men's foil was a fencing event held as part of the Fencing at the 1912 Summer Olympics programme. It was the fourth appearance of the event, which had not been contested in 1908. There were 94 competitors from 15 nations, a large increase from the 9 fencers who had competed in 1904. The event was won by Nedo Nadi of Italy, the first of his two victories in the event. His countryman Pietro Speciale took silver, while Richard Verderber of Austria took bronze.

Background

This was the fourth appearance of the event, which has been held at every Summer Olympics except 1908 (when there was a foil display only rather than a medal event). The organizers of the 1912 Games explicitly rejected the 1908 organizers' view that foil fencing was not suitable for competition. The only fencer from 1904 to return was silver medalist Albertson Van Zo Post of the United States. France and Italy were the strongest nations in foil fencing; a dispute over the rules led to the French team boycotting the fencing competitions.

Bohemia, Denmark, Great Britain, Hungary, the Netherlands, Norway, Russia, and South Africa each made their debut in the men's foil. The United States made its third appearance, having missed only the inaugural 1896 competition.

Competition format

The event used a four-round format. In each round, the fencers were divided into pools to play a round-robin within the pool. Bouts were to five touches. Standard foil rules were used, including that touches had to be made with the tip of the foil, the target area was limited to the torso, and priority determined the winner of double touches. However, there were significant disputes over particulars of the rules, which led to the French boycott.
 Round 1: There were 16 pools, each of between 4 and 7 fencers. The top 3 fencers in each pool advanced to the quarterfinals.
 Quarterfinals: There were 8 pools of 6 fencers each. The top 3 fencers in each quarterfinal advanced to the semifinals.
 Semifinals: There were 4 pools of 6 fencers each. The top 2 fencers in each semifinal advanced to the final.
 Final: The final pool had 8 fencers.

Schedule

Results

Round 1

Pool A

Pool B

Pool C

Pool D

Pool E

Pool F

Pool G

Pool H

Pool I

Pool J

Pool K

Pool L

Pool M

Pool N

Pool O

Pool P

Quarterfinals

Quarterfinal A

Quarterfinal B

Quarterfinal C

Quarterfinal D

Quarterfinal E

Quarterfinal F

Quarterfinal G

Quarterfinal H

Semifinals

Semifinal A

Semifinal B

Semifinal C

Semifinal D

Final

The first tie-breaker was hits received in victories; Verderber and Berti each were hit 10 times in their 4 wins, while Alaimo was hit 11 times in his 4 wins.

References

 
 

Fencing at the 1912 Summer Olympics